The Dipșa is a left tributary of the river Șieu in Romania. It flows into the Șieu near Chiraleș.

The following rivers are tributaries to the river Dipșa:
Left: Archiud, Lechința, Chiraleș
Right: Pintic, Valea Mică

References

Rivers of Romania
Rivers of Bistrița-Năsăud County